The Ulster GAA Hurling Senior Championship, known simply as the Ulster Championship, was an annual inter-county hurling competition organised by the Ulster Council of the Gaelic Athletic Association (GAA). It was the highest inter-county hurling competition in the province of Ulster, and was contested every year between the 1901 championship and the 2017 Championship. As of 2023 there has been no attempt to revive the competition.

The final, usually held in July, served as the culmination of a series of games played during June, and the results determined which team received the Liam Harvey Cup. The championship was played on a straight knockout basis whereby once a team loses they are eliminated from the championship.

In 2016, a two-tier format began with four teams competing in the Ulster Senior Hurling Championship, and four in the Ulster Senior Hurling Shield.

The title has been won at least once by five Ulster counties, all of which have won the title more than once. The all-time record-holders are Antrim who have won the competition 57 times. Antrim are also the current champions.

Standing of the Ulster Championship

While the Munster Hurling Championship and the Leinster Hurling Championship are generally held in very high regard, and have produced the vast majority of recent All-Ireland Hurling Champions, the Ulster Championship has not been regarded historically as of a similar standard, and the Ulster champions have entered the All-Ireland Hurling Championship at an earlier round than the Munster and Leinster champions.

This is due to a number of factors, one of which is the dominance of Gaelic football in eight of the nine counties of Ulster. An Ulster team has never won the All-Ireland Senior Hurling Championship, although Antrim were finalists in 1943 and 1989. Antrim have dominated the Ulster Championship throughout its existence, winning the title 57 times to date.

While below the standard of Leinster and Munster hurling, the Ulster championship has been generally more competitive than the now discontinued Connacht Senior Hurling Championship. However, Galway, by far the strongest team in Connacht, have historically performed much better than any Ulster team, with several All-Ireland titles, and generally recognised as one of the major powers in the sport.

Top winners

Antrim's historic domination (only 3 finals have not featured the county; 1908, 1934 and 2001) has led over time to periods of uncompetitive competitions, and the championship was not played at all between 1950 and 1988. However, there have been periods when this domination has made way for periods of intense rivalry, notably between Antrim and Monaghan in the 1910s, between Antrim and Down in the 1990s, and between Antrim and Derry in the early 2000s.

The 2001 Championship was unique in terms of being the only final since the reactivation of the Championship in 1988 which did not feature Antrim, as Derry defeated Down at Casement Park. Equally of note, Antrim have won every final since (albeit one on replay), their longest period of continuous success since 1988.

Ulster Senior Hurling Shield
The following teams have won the Ulster Senior Hurling Shield.

Ulster Championship moments

Down 2–16 – 0–11 Antrim (12 July 1992 at Casement Park) – An historic day for Down who claimed a first provincial title since 1941. Victory would have been more decisive but for a tally of 13 wides in the first half. While Antrim lacked an attacking ace, Down's Gerard McGrattan was their candidate for man of the match. Goalkeeper Noel Keith also brought off some remarkable saves, most notably from a Ciaran Barr shot in the first half.
Derry 4–8 – 0–19 Antrim (9 July 2000 at Casement Park) – An historic day for Derry who secured the Ulster title for the first time in 92 years. Dual player Kieran McKeever got the opening goal for Derry, while Gary Biggs and Ollie Collins scored Derry's other two goals to give Derry an eight-point interval lead. A replay looked likely after John O'Dwyer's late goal levelled the scores minutes from time, however, it was Collins again scoring from a free to gain the winning point, and the title for Derry.
Derry 1–17 – 3–10 Down (15 July 2001 at Casement Park) – A first for Derry as they retain the Ulster title for the only time in their history. It was the first final not to feature Antrim since 1934. A point from John O'Dwyer won the match for Derry. Despite dominating the play in the second half, Down only managed to score three points.
Antrim 2–20 – 1–14 New York (22 October 2006 at Canton Field) – For the first and only time in the history of the championships, the Ulster final was played at Canton Field in Boston. This was to facilitate some of the New York teams who were unable to travel to Ireland due to their immigration status. A tally of 1–7 for Johnny McIntosh helped Antrim to a fifth successive championship.

Statistics and records

By decade

The most successful team of each decade, judged by number of Ulster Senior Hurling Championship titles, is as follows:

 1900s: 7 for Antrim (1900-01-03-04-05-07-09)
 1910s: 4 for Antrim (1910-11-13-16)
 1920s: 6 for Antrim (1934-25-26-27-28-29)
 1930s: 9 for Antrim (1930-31-33-34-35-36-37-38-39)
 1940s: 8 for Antrim (1940-43-44-45-46-47-48-49)
 1980s: 1 for Antrim (1989)
 1990s: 7 for Antrim (1990-91-93-94-96-98-99)
 2000s: 8 for Antrim (2002-03-04-05-06-07-08-09)
 2010s: 6 for Antrim (2010-11-12-13-14-15)

Biggest wins

The most one sided Ulster finals:
 38 points – 1930: Antrim 10–4 (44) – (6) 2–0 Down
 35 points – 1906: Donegal 5–21 (36) – (1) 0–1 Antrim
 29 points – 1901: Antrim 0–41 (41) – (12) 0–12 Derry
 27 points – 1935: Antrim 7–9 (30) – (3) 0–3 Cavan
 26 points – 2007: Antrim 2–24 (30) – (4) 0–4 Down

Successful defending

3 teams of the 4 who have won the Ulster championship have ever successfully defended the title. These are:
 Antrim on 42 attempts out of 54 (1901, 1904, 1905, 1910, 1911, 1925, 1926, 1927, 1928, 1929, 1930, 1931, 1934, 1935, 1936, 1937, 1938, 1939, 1940, 1944, 1945, 1946, 1947, 1948, 1949, 1990, 1991, 1994, 1999, 2003, 2004, 2005, 2006, 2007, 2008, 2009, 2010, 2011, 2012, 2013, 2014, 2015)
 Derry on 1 attempts out of 4 (2001)
 Monaghan on 1 attempts out of 2 (1915)

Gaps

Longest gaps between successive Ulster titles:

 92 years: Derry (1908–2000)
 51 years: Down (1941–1992)
 40 years: Antrim (1949–1989)
 17 years: Donegal (1906–1923)

Longest undefeated run

The record for the longest unbeaten run stands at 24 games held by Antrim. It began with a 5–19 to 2–11 win against New York in the semi-final of the 2002 championship and will continue into the 2016 championship.

Roll of Honour

 1929 Antrim declared champions – Donegal disqualified
 1901: Antrim defeated Derry 41 points to 12 points – exact score not given

Player Records and Statistics

Winning Teams

See also

 All-Ireland Senior Hurling Championship
 Munster Senior Hurling Championship
 Leinster Senior Hurling Championship
 Connacht Senior Hurling Championship

References

 
1
Senior inter-county hurling competitions